Hank Aaron: Chasing the Dream is a 1995 American documentary film directed by Michael Tollin. The story follows baseball slugger Hank Aaron's pursuit of Babe Ruth's all-time record for home runs.

Accolades
It was nominated for an Academy Award for Best Documentary Feature. It also won the Peabody Award.

References

External links

AllMovie
Hanks' for the Memories |Entertainment Weekly.com

1995 films
1995 documentary films
1990s sports films
American sports documentary films
Documentary films about baseball
Films directed by Michael Tollin
Peabody Award-winning broadcasts
1990s English-language films
1990s American films